Team Malaysia was a professional Dota 2 team based in Kuala Lumpur, Malaysia.

Background 
Team Malaysia was one of the best professional Dota 2 teams in Southeast Asia, establishing dominance in the region from their formation, and in May 2015, ranked as the world's 8th best and Southeast-Asia's best team, with an all time win rate of 82%.

Team Malaysia's final member lineup consists of 4 out of the 5 members that represented Orange eSports in The International 2013 tournament, where they notably achieved third place and won $287,441 of winnings, the highest ever for a Southeast Asian team.

History

Prior history

Orange eSports 
Team Malaysia traces its roots to Orange eSports, which was formed by Team Malaysia captain Chai "Mushi" Yee Fung on 5 September 2011

In August 2013, after the impressive 3rd position that Orange eSports achieved at The International 2013, team captain Chai "Mushi" Yee Fung announced his departure from the team to leave for China. The team was fully disbanded a month later when all the members decided to leave the team.

Separation 
After Orange eSports was disbanded, the members joined several different teams, with 4 players joining Malaysian team Titan, which notably won $49,188 in The International 2014 after coming in 9-10th place, and former team captain Chai "Mushi" Yee Fung joining China's Team DK, which notably won US$819,833 after coming in 4th place also in The International 2014

Team Malaysia first iteration 
On 1 October 2014, team Titan's Dota 2 manager announced that the Titan Dota 2 team would be participating in the World Cyber Arena 2014 tournament as Team Malaysia, with Mushi joining the team in place of Ng "YamateH" Wei Poong. The team finished 5th/6th in the tournament after losing to Cloud9. The team split up shortly afterwards.

EHOME 
On 7 January 2015, EHOME was resurrected after almost 3 years of inactivity, with former Team Malaysia members Chai "Mushi" Yee Fung and Chong "Ohaiyo" Xin Khoo among the members. However, the team failed to perform, coming in at 9th-12th-place performance in the Dota 2 Asia Championships.

EHOME.my 
After a disappointing 9th-12th-place performance in the Dota 2 Asia Championships, the team was split off from the main EHOME team and was named "EHOME.my", featuring Lee "kYxY" Kang Yang, Fadil "Kecik Imba" bin Mohd Raziff, and Siong "JoHnNy" Tait Lee, as well as Chai "Mushi" Yee Fung and Chong "Ohaiyo" Xin Khoo.

On 26 March 2015, EHOME announced the dropping of the EHOME.my branch.

Team Malaysia 
On 26 March 2015, the same day that EHOME.my was dropped by EHOME, Team Malaysia was officially formed consisting of the same members as the former EHOME.my.

Dissolution 
On 5 June 2015, it was announced that Fnatic had acquired Team Malaysia.

Team roster

Tournaments

Premier tournaments

Major tournaments

Minor tournaments

References 

Dota teams
Esports teams based in Malaysia
2011 establishments in Malaysia
Sports teams in Malaysia